Gray Ghost or Grey Ghost may refer to:

Arts and entertainment
 The Gray Ghost (TV series), a 1950s American historical television series
 Grey Ghost, a band fronted by Ruby Starr
 Gray Ghost (DC animated universe), a superhero in Batman: The Animated Series voiced by Adam West
 The Gray Ghost (serial), a 1917 film serial that is currently lost media
 Grey Ghost, a fictional hero in the novel Everybody's All-American
 Grey Ghost of the forest, an alias of Dog from New Zealand comic strip Footrot Flats
 Grey Ghost, a fictional character in the Speed Racer film adaptation

People
 John S. Mosby (1833–1916), Confederate cavalryman and partisan who fought during the American Civil War
 Roosevelt Williams (1903–1996), blues pianist nicknamed "Grey Ghost"
 Tony Canadeo (1919–2003), football star, "the Gray Ghost of Gonzaga"

Ships
 USS Enterprise (CV-6), US Aircraft Carrier
 USS Pensacola (CA-24), US Heavy Cruiser
 USS Iowa (BB-61), US Battleship
 RMS Queen Mary, an ocean liner painted Navy Grey for use as a troopship during the Second World War

Other uses
 Weimaraner, a breed of dogs
 a male Northern harrier
 an early Rolls-Royce Limited car model
 Gray Ghost, slang term for a Walther P38 pistol
 Gray Ghost, a nickname for the experimental aircraft YF-23 Black Widow II
 Grey Ghost, the mascot of Illinois Valley Central High School
 Grey Ghost, a nickname for the bonefish
 Grey Ghosts, the mascot of Westford Academy

See also
 Grey Ghost Streamer, an artificial fly, of the streamer type
 The Grey Lady, the ghost of Helena Ravenclaw in the Harry Potter series